Nowshiravan (also Romanized as Nowshīravān; also known as Anowshīravān) is a village in Ersi Rural District, in the Central District of Jolfa County, East Azerbaijan Province, Iran. At the 2006 census, its population was 245, in 66 families.

References 

Populated places in Jolfa County